Kuznetsovo is a rural locality (a village) in Chernushinsky District, Perm Krai, Russia. The population was 65 as of 2010. There is 1 street.

Geography 
Kuznetsovo is located 20 km south of Chernushka (the district's administrative centre) by road. Yetysh is the nearest rural locality.

References 

Rural localities in Chernushinsky District